Calle Mayor may refer to:

 Calle Mayor (Madrid), a street in Madrid, Spain
 Calle Mayor (film), a 1956 Spanish film
 Calle Mayor Middle School, a middle school in Torrance, California

See also
 Main Street (disambiguation)